The RMR was a double-action revolver chambered for .357 Magnum cartridges chosen by the French National Police to replace the Manurhin MR 73. Production was a joint venture between Manurhin and Sturm, Ruger & Co. and ran from 1981 to 1984.

Description
In order to produce a more affordable revolver, Manurhin signed an agreement with the American firm Sturm Ruger, which specializes in micro-fusion and investment casting, processes which are less-expensive than machining firearm parts from blocks of forged steel.  The resulting weapon was the RMR (Ruger Manurhin), with a frame and mechanism made by Ruger, and the barrel and cylinder made by Manurhin similar to the Manurhin MR 73.  Production was small and the gun was replaced by the Manurhin Special Police F1 (SP F1).

References

Ruger revolvers
Revolvers of France
.357 Magnum firearms
Police weapons
Weapons and ammunition introduced in 1981